Halysidota fumosa is a moth of the family Erebidae. It was described by William Schaus in 1912. It is found in Costa Rica, Colombia and Ecuador.

References

Halysidota
Moths described in 1912